Jeremy D. Bullins is an American NASCAR crew chief who works for Team Penske as the crew chief for Austin Cindric's No. 2 Ford Mustang in the NASCAR Cup Series. 

Bullins has worked for Penske since 2012. During his time there, he was Ryan Blaney's crew chief from 2015 to 2019 in the Cup Series, both with the No. 21 Wood Brothers Racing team and on Penske's No. 12 car. He won the 2022 Daytona 500 with Austin Cindric.

Career

1999–2011: Pre-Penske years
After graduating college, Bullins began his career in NASCAR with Wood Brothers Racing in October 1999, whose No. 21 car was driven at the time by Elliott Sadler. After his time with the Wood Brothers, he would work in the Busch Series (later Nationwide) for ST Motorsports, which is now JTG Daugherty Racing. He would later leave that team for Robert Yates Racing. Before the 2005 season, Bullins joined Richard Childress Racing. During his time there, he worked as the engineer for Kevin Harvick and Clint Bowyer, and with those two drivers, he racked up a total of nine wins.

2012–2014: Penske NNS No. 22
Bullins was hired in December 2011 by Penske Racing to crew chief the No. 22 team in the Nationwide Series beginning in 2012. He replaced Todd Gordon, who was promoted to crew chief Penske's No. 22 team in the Cup Series after Steve Addington left for Stewart-Haas Racing to be defending series champion Tony Stewart's crew chief that year.

In his first year as crew chief for that team, he worked with Brad Keselowski, Parker Kligerman and Jacques Villeneuve. Kligerman would be released and replaced by Ryan Blaney for the rest of his part-time schedule in the car during the season. He earned three wins that season with Keselowski and came close to winning with the other two drivers as well, as Blaney finished second at Texas in November and Villeneuve finished third at Montreal after running out of fuel on the last lap and losing the lead he had held for most of the race. The team finished the year sixth in owner points.

For 2013, the team saw a notable uptick in performance. Bullins won at least one race with all four drivers of the No. 22 car that year. Keselowski scored six wins (up from three in 2012), and Blaney would earn his first win in the series at Kentucky in September. Also, Joey Logano, Penske's new full-time Cup Series driver, also ran 14 races in the No. 22 car (Keselowski and Blaney each reduced their schedules by a few races to make room for Logano to drive the car as well). Logano came to Penske from Joe Gibbs Racing at the start of the year, and he was instrumental in leading JGR's No. 18 car to the 2012 NNS owner's championship. A. J. Allmendinger replaced Villeneuve as the No. 22's driver for the standalone road course races of Road America and Mid-Ohio Sports Car Course (which replaced Montreal on the schedule), and would win both of them in dominating fashion. Logano would pick up three wins, which came at both Dover races plus Chicago in July. All of this success resulted in the team winning the 2013 owner's championship.

2015–present: NASCAR Cup Series

2015–2019: Ryan Blaney
Bullins returned to the Wood Brothers team in 2015. Now only a part-time team, the No. 21 car was driven by Blaney starting that year, replacing Trevor Bayne, who moved to Roush Fenway Racing to replace the departing Carl Edwards as a full-time driver on that team. WBR also switched from a Roush alliance to a Penske alliance starting in 2015, which is why Bullins was able to work for the team as he was still part of the Penske family. He had previously made his Cup Series crew chiefing debut on Penske's part time No. 12 car when Blaney drove it in his first two Cup races at Kansas and Talladega.

2020–present: Brad Keselowski and Austin Cindric
Despite even having a solid 2019 season, Penske announced a crew chief shakeup for the 2020 season in an effort to be more competitive and dominant like the successes Joe Gibbs Racing was having. During Bullins' time with the No. 12 of Ryan Blaney, the car was arguably the weakest in the Penske stable both years, and he was reassigned to Brad Keselowski's No. 2 team, replacing Paul Wolfe, who moved to Joey Logano's No. 22. Todd Gordon, who had been Logano's crew chief and was very much successful in that role, replaced Bullins as Blaney's crew chief on the No. 12.

The duo started the year off on a good note, and Keselowski led 30 laps in the Daytona 500 and 82 at Phoenix three races later. After the first four races, the season was halted for two months due to the coronavirus pandemic. Keselowski and Bullins won 4 races that year, including the 2020 Coca-Cola 600 and finished second in the final standings behind Chase Elliott.

In 2021, Keselowski finished sixth in the final standings and only won the race at Talladega in April. It was his last season with Penske before leaving for Roush Fenway Racing to become the driver of their No. 6 car as well as a co-owner of the team, which was renamed RFK Racing. Bullins would remain the crew chief of the No. 2 car in 2022 when Austin Cindric moved up from Penske's Xfinity Series No. 22 car to replace Keselowski. Cindric and Bullins won the 2022 Daytona 500. On July 20, Bullins was suspended for four races due to a tire and wheel loss during the 2022 Ambetter 301 at Loudon.

Personal life
Bullins is a 1995 graduate of South Stokes High School and then attended North Carolina State University, studying Mechanical Engineering. He is from Walnut Cove, North Carolina, and lives in China Grove, North Carolina today with his wife Tina.

References

External links
 

Living people
People from Stokes County, North Carolina
NASCAR crew chiefs
Year of birth missing (living people)